Residency may refer to:

 Domicile (law), the act of establishing or maintaining a residence in a given place
 Permanent residency, indefinite residence within a country despite not having citizenship
 Residency (medicine), a stage of postgraduate medical training
 Residency (pharmacy), a stage of postgraduate pharmaceutical training
 Artist-in-residence, a program to sponsor the residence and work of visual artists, writers, musicians, etc.
 Concert residency, a series of concerts performed at one venue
 Residency (administrative division), notably for indirect rule, in the British and Dutch colonial Empires
 Residencies of British India

See also 
 Diplomatic mission, the home of an ambassador
 Residence
 Resident (disambiguation)
 The Residency (disambiguation)